Whitin Observatory  is an astronomical observatory owned and operated by Wellesley College.  Built in 1900, with additions in 1906, 1967, and 2010, it is located in Wellesley, Massachusetts and named after Wellesley College trustee Mrs. John Crane Whitin (Sarah Elizabeth Whitin) of Whitinsville, who donated the funds for the observatory. Astronomer Sarah Frances Whiting was the first director of the new Wellesley College Astronomy Department.

The facilities include a 0.7m PlaneWave CDK700 reflector, a 12" Fitz/Clark refractor, a 6" Alvan Clark refractor, a Hale Spectrohelioscope, and Meade 8" SCTs.

History 
In 1896, Wellesley College physics professor Sarah Frances Whiting met trustee Sarah Elizabeth Whitin at a traditional college ceremony, "Float Night." The conversation turned to a 12" refracting telescope Whiting had used that was being offered for sale,
and as told in Wellesley College 1875–1975: A Century of Women:

Whiting used the telescope in teaching her classes in astronomy to Wellesley students, one of the first of its kind. It quickly became apparent that the Observatory would need to be expanded. Sarah Frances Whiting wrote in Whitin's obituary "An Appreciation," which appeared in The Wellesley College News

According to Wellesley records, in 1942, before the U.S. entered World War II, "astronomy professor Helen Dodson and Barbara McCarthy, professor of Greek, teach a secret course in cryptography to (at least) ten students. The course was taught evenings at the Observatory, where late-night activity would not attract attention. Following graduation, most of these students went on to work for the [U.S. Navy] WAVES (Women Accepted for Volunteer Emergency Service), working on Japanese and German codes."

Faculty 
 Sarah Frances Whiting
 Ellen Amanda Hayes
 Leah Allen
 John Charles Duncan

Students 

 Annie Jump Cannon, after whom the Annie J. Cannon Award in Astronomy was named.
 Andrea Dupree
 Martha P. Haynes
 Pamela Melroy
 Nergis Mavalvala

Friends 
 Margaret Lindsay Huggins, who bequeathed items to the observatory

See also
 List of astronomical observatories

References

External links 

Wellesley College Astronomy Department

 
Astronomical observatories in Massachusetts
Buildings and structures in Norfolk County, Massachusetts
Wellesley College